Yelansky (masculine), Yelanskaya (feminine), or Yelanskoye (neuter) is the name of several rural localities in Russia:
Yelansky, Irkutsk Oblast, a settlement in Kuytunsky District of Irkutsk Oblast
Yelansky, Saratov Oblast, a settlement in Samoylovsky District of Saratov Oblast
Yelansky, Sverdlovsk Oblast, a settlement in Kamyshlovsky District of Sverdlovsk Oblast
Yelansky, Volgograd Oblast, a khutor in Bukanovsky Selsoviet of Kumylzhensky District of Volgograd Oblast
Yelansky, Kolenovskoye Rural Settlement, Novokhopyorsky District, Voronezh Oblast, a settlement in Kolenovskoye Rural Settlement of Novokhopyorsky District of Voronezh Oblast
Yelansky, Novokhopyorsk Urban Settlement, Novokhopyorsky District, Voronezh Oblast, a settlement under the administrative jurisdiction of Novokhopyorsk Urban Settlement, Novokhopyorsky District, Voronezh Oblast
Yelanskaya, Rostov Oblast, a stanitsa in Veshenskoye Rural Settlement of Sholokhovsky District of Rostov Oblast
Yelanskaya, Tyumen Oblast, a village in Karagaysky Rural Okrug of Vagaysky District of Tyumen Oblast